John Seabrook Plantation Bridge, also known as Admiral George Palmer's Bridge, is a historic arch bridge located at Rockville, Charleston County, South Carolina. It was built about 1782, and is constructed of brick veneer enclosing a fill mixture of crushed oyster shells and rammed earth.

It was listed on the National Register of Historic Places in 1974.

References

Road bridges on the National Register of Historic Places in South Carolina
Infrastructure completed in 1782
Buildings and structures in Charleston County, South Carolina
National Register of Historic Places in Charleston County, South Carolina
1782 establishments in South Carolina
Arch bridges in the United States
Brick bridges in the United States